Miranda de Pencier (born August 20, 1968 in Toronto, Ontario) is a Canadian film and television director, producer, and actress. She is most noted for her 2011 film Throat Song, which won the Canadian Screen Award for Best Live Action Short Drama at the 1st Canadian Screen Awards.

Career 
She began her career as an actress, most notably playing Josie Pye in the 1985 telemovie Anne of Green Gables and its sequels. She also had a recurring role on Street Legal in the 1989–90 season as Jennifer Winston, a college student who was dating Chuck Tchobanian, and appeared in the film The Myth of the Male Orgasm and on stage in Canadian productions of Les Misérables and Aspects of Love.

In the late 1990s she began producing, first in theatre before moving into film production. Through her production company, Northwood Entertainment, she first produced the 2005 film Cake. Her subsequent credits as a producer have included the films Pu-239, Adam and Beginners, the television series Wild Roses and the new 2017 Anne of Green Gables adaptation Anne with an E.

The short film Throat Song was her debut as a director. Her feature debut, The Grizzlies, debuted at the 2018 Toronto International Film Festival in September 2018. In October, de Pencier won the Directors Guild of Canada award for Best Direction in a Feature Film for The Grizzlies.

Personal life
She is the daughter of magazine publisher Michael de Pencier, and the sister of documentary filmmaker Nicholas de Pencier.

Filmography

Acting

Film

Television

Producing

Film

Television

References

External links

1968 births
Living people
20th-century Canadian actresses
Canadian child actresses
Canadian television actresses
Canadian film actresses
Canadian musical theatre actresses
Canadian women film directors
Film producers from Ontario
Canadian television producers
Canadian women television producers
Actresses from Toronto
Film directors from Toronto
Directors of Genie and Canadian Screen Award winners for Best Live Action Short Drama
Canadian Film Centre alumni